The 2014 FINA Youth Water Polo World Championship was held in Turkey from 2 to 10 August.

Qualified teams

Group A

Group B

Group C

Group D

2014 in Turkish sport
International water polo competitions hosted by Turkey